James McGrath (4 March 1907 – 17 October 1950) was an English footballer. A speedy and crafty player, he played at left-half and on the right-wing. He began his career in 1928 at Cardiff City, before switching to Port Vale in May 1932. He was transferred to Notts County in June 1934, and later moved on to Bradford Park Avenue.

Career
McGrath played for Washington Colliery, before joining Cardiff City in 1928. The "Bluebirds" suffered relegation out of the First Division following a last place finish in 1928–29. They posted an eighth-place finish in the Second Division in 1929–30, before suffering another relegation in 1930–31 with another last place finish. Cardiff finished in ninth place in the Third Division South in 1931–32. In his four seasons at Ninian Park, McGrath featured in 33 league games. He returned to the Second Division when he signed with Port Vale in May 1932. His debut came on 9 May at the humiliating 7–0 Potteries derby defeat to Stoke City in the North Staffordshire Infirmary Cup final. He scored his first goal for the club on 3 December 1932, in a 2–1 defeat to Oldham Athletic at Boundary Park. He scored a total of eight goals in 29 appearances in the 1932–33 season, getting on the scoresheet against Stoke City at The Old Recreation Ground and against Manchester United at Old Trafford. He scored three goals in 39 games in the 1933–34 campaign, but was transferred to league rivals Notts County in June 1934. He later moved on to Bradford Park Avenue, eventually joining the training staff there.

Later life
McGrath took up employment at Ryhope Colliery after the Second World War. He died suddenly at the site on 17 October 1950.

Career statistics
Source:

References

People from Washington, Tyne and Wear
Footballers from Tyne and Wear
English footballers
Association football wing halves
Association football wingers
Cardiff City F.C. players
Port Vale F.C. players
Notts County F.C. players
Bradford (Park Avenue) A.F.C. players
English Football League players
1907 births
1950 deaths